Keffer is a surname. Notable people with the surname include:

Bill Keffer (born 1958), American attorney and politician
Frank Keffer (1861–?), baseball player
Jim Keffer (born 1953), American businessman and politician
Warren Keffer, Bablyon 5 character